The Captain's Daughter is a 1958 Soviet drama film directed by Vladimir Kaplunovskiy. The film is an adaptation of the historical novel The Captain's Daughter (1836) by Alexander Pushkin.

Plot 
The film tells the story of the nobleman Grinyov, going to military service in the fortress, where he falls in love with the commander's daughter, Maria, and fights for her in a duel. After that, Yemelyan Pugachev organizes Pugachev's Rebellion, conquers the fortress and executes Maria's parents, but he gives Grinev freedom. Soon he learns that Pugachev's accomplice forces Maria to marry him...

Cast 
 Oleg Strizhenov as Pyotr Grinyov
 Sergei Lukyanov as Yemelyan Pugachyov
 Iya Arepina as Masha Mironova
 Vladimir Dorofeyev as Ivan Kuzmich
 Irina Zarubina as Vasilisa Yegorovna
 Anatoli Shishkov as Savelyich
 Vyacheslav Shalevich as Shvabrin
 Pavel Pavlenko as Ivan Ignatyevich
 Boris Novikov as Maksimych

References

External links 
 
 Капитанская дочка on Kinopoisk

1958 films
1950s Russian-language films
Soviet drama films
1958 drama films
Mosfilm films
Films based on works by Aleksandr Pushkin
The Captain's Daughter
Films based on Russian novels
Films about rebellions
Films about nobility
Films scored by Tikhon Khrennikov